In mathematical optimization, the active-set method is an algorithm used to identify the active constraints in a set of inequality constraints. The active constraints are then expressed as equality constraints,  thereby transforming an inequality-constrained problem into a simpler equality-constrained subproblem.

An optimization problem is defined using an objective function to minimize or maximize, and a set of constraints

 

that define the feasible region, that is, the set of all x to search for the optimal solution. Given a point  in the feasible region, a constraint 

 

is called active at  if , and inactive at  if  Equality constraints are always active.

The active set is particularly important in optimization theory, as it determines which constraints will influence the final result of optimization. For example, in solving the linear programming problem, the active set gives the hyperplanes that intersect at the solution point. In quadratic programming, as the solution is not necessarily on one of the edges of the bounding polygon, an estimation of the active set gives us a subset of inequalities to watch while searching the solution, which reduces the complexity of the search.

Active-set methods
In general an active-set algorithm has the following structure:

 Find a feasible starting point
 repeat until "optimal enough"
 solve the equality problem defined by the active set (approximately)
 compute the Lagrange multipliers of the active set
 remove a subset of the constraints with negative Lagrange multipliers
 search for infeasible constraints
 end repeat

Methods that can be described as active-set methods include:
 Successive linear programming (SLP) 
 Sequential quadratic programming (SQP) 
 Sequential linear-quadratic programming (SLQP) 
 Reduced gradient method (RG) 
 Generalized reduced gradient method (GRG)

References

Bibliography
  
 

Optimization algorithms and methods